Cassette Recordings '87, also issued with the title From the Board, is the third live album by the free jazz group Last Exit. It was released in March 1987 by Enemy Records.

Reception

In a review for AllMusic, John Dougan wrote: "Still live, still pumping big-time improvised noise wail... This is mighty powerful stuff, and those a tad squeamish when it comes to full-bore noisemaking and improvised energy should explore this record only with proper supervision. There's no telling what will happen if you're left alone with these guys for any length of time."

Steve Huey, in a second AllMusic review, stated: "more fine work from free jazz's answer to heavy metal... if you like their sound, most of what's out there is pretty high-quality, and From the Board is no exception."

Track listing

Personnel 
Last Exit
Peter Brötzmann – alto saxophone, bass saxophone, tenor saxophone, tárogató
Ronald Shannon Jackson – drums, voice
Bill Laswell – Fender 6-string bass
Sonny Sharrock – guitar
Technical personnel
Robert Musso – producer
Howie Weinberg – mastering

Release history

References

External links 
 Cassette Recordings '87 at Bandcamp
 

1987 live albums
Last Exit (free jazz band) albums
Celluloid Records albums
Enemy Records live albums
Albums produced by Robert Musso